Central Florida is a region of the U.S. state of Florida. Different sources give different definitions for the region, but as its name implies it is usually said to comprise the central part of the state, including the Tampa Bay area and the Greater Orlando area, though in recent times the Tampa Bay area has often been described as its own region, with "Central Florida" becoming more synonymous with the Orlando area (most notably, this is what the local news channels in each respective metro area call their region).

It is one of Florida's three directional regions, along with North Florida and South Florida. Under the previously mentioned "usual" definition, it includes the following 13 counties: Brevard, Citrus, Hernando, Hillsborough, Lake, Orange, Osceola, Pasco, Pinellas, Polk, Seminole, Sumter, Volusia. Sometimes Ocala which is Marion County was sometimes included.
though Citrus, Hernando, Hillsborough, Pasco, Pinellas, are also considered to be the Tampa Bay area.

Geography
Like many vernacular regions, Central Florida's boundaries are not official or consistent, and are defined differently by different sources. A 2007 study of Florida's regions by geographers Ary Lamme and Raymond K. Oldakowski found that Floridians surveyed identified Central Florida as comprising a large swath of peninsular Florida. This area encompassed the interior, including the Orlando metropolitan area, and coastal stretches from the Citrus County south to the Hillsborough County in the west and from Volusia County south to Sebastian in the east.  

Central Florida is one of Florida's three most common directional regions, the others being North Florida and South Florida. Lamme and Oldakowski note that the directional region is more commonly used in the interior areas rather than on the coast. In fact, while coastal areas often have their own regional vernacular identities such as the Space Coast and the Nature Coast, no vernacular regions were reported on the interior of the state other than Central Florida.

Enterprise Florida, the state's economic development agency, identifies "Central Florida" as one of eight economic regions used by the agency and other state and outside entities, including the Florida Department of Transportation. This definition covers much of the same area as in Lamme and Oldakowski's survey, with some exceptions. It excludes the Tampa Bay Area and as well as the southern coastal counties (the Treasure Coast, which is included in "Southeast" or "South Florida"). The Central region includes the Orlando metropolitan area (Orange, Lake, Osceola, and Seminole Counties), and Sumter, Polk counties in the interior,
Citrus, Hernando, Hillsborough, Pasco, and Pinellas counties on the west coast and Volusia and Brevard Counties on the east coast.

The central cities of both metropolitan areas (Orlando and Tampa) are in close proximity, and as a result, their two metropolitan areas blend together in the area of Lakeland to make up a larger contiguous population center often referred to as the I-4 corridor. This is a population concentration that stretches from Tampa Bay on the west coast to Daytona Beach and Cape Canaveral on the east coast of the state.

With the exception of hill terrain in Mount Dora, southern Lake County, Polk County (Lake Wales Ridge) Pasco County, and Hernando County (Brooksville Ridge). Central Florida is mostly flatland with significant amounts of open space and over 1,500 lakes and ponds. There is a mixture of wetlands, Cypress, Oak, Maple and Pine forests, pastures, prairies and coastline.

Major rivers include the St. Johns River, the Halifax River, the Ocklawaha River and the Econlockhatchee River. Major lakes include Lake Apopka, Lake Tohopekaliga, East Lake Tohopekaliga, Lake Louisa, Lake Monroe, Lake Jessup, and the Butler Chain of Lakes. Major beaches include Canaveral National Seashore, New Smyrna Beach, Daytona Beach, Cocoa Beach, and Indialantic Beach near Melbourne.

Counties
Brevard
|-
Citrus
|-
Hernando
|-
Hillsborough
|-
Lake
|-
Orange
|-
Osceola
|-
Pasco 
|-
Pinellas
|-
Polk 
|-
Seminole 
|-
Sumter 
|-
Volusia
}}

Climate
Hurricanes are a threat to the coastal cities as evidenced by the 2004 hurricane season, which brought three major hurricanes to the Central Florida area: Charley, Jeanne, and Frances.Winters are dry and temperate with the average winter high temperature in Orlando being  and the average winter low temperature being . Summers are hot and humid with high temperatures averaging  and low temperatures averaging . Peak summer heat generally arrives in early June and continues to early October.

The combination of high temperatures, high humidity, and opposing sea breezes from both the Gulf and Atlantic coasts, results in significant thunderstorm activity from June to September for the interior counties. Central Florida records more lightning strikes per area than any other region in Florida, and Florida records more lightning strikes than any other state in the US. As a result, Florida, and more specifically, Central Florida, is often referred to as the "Thunderstorm capital of the USA", or "Lightning Alley".

These severe thunderstorms often make Central Florida prone to many tornadoes. However, they are usually small, short lived, and almost always rated as EF0 or EF1 size storms.

Central Florida has a subtropical climate. A climate that is typical for the majority of the state, except for South Florida, which has a true tropical climate. Unlike South Florida, where temperatures below  practically never occur, Central Florida can see occasional freezing temperatures in the winter. Consequently, most of Central Florida cannot accommodate the same tropical plants found in Southern Florida with the exception of coastal areas in the Tampa Bay area, Brevard county, and Indian River county due to maritime influences of the Gulf of Mexico and Atlantic Ocean. However, winters are still considered very mild by United States standards. The low temperatures are mainly in the upper 40s °F.

History

At the end of the Civil War, aside from the cattle, cotton, and coastal lands, much of Central Florida was wetlands. It took a major drainage project financed by businessman Hamilton Disston in the 1880s to make these wetland areas available for settlement.
 
Sanford was incorporated in 1877 as a port city at the Lake Monroe intersection and the St. Johns River. It was envisioned as a transportation center; the city's founder, Henry S. Sanford, nicknamed it "the Gate City of South Florida". It became a hub for shipping agricultural products, which earned the city another nickname, "Celery City".

Kissimmee, originally named Allendale, after Confederate Major J.H. Allen, who operated the first cargo steamboat on the Kissimmee River, boomed in the 1880s. It was the headquarters of Hamilton Disston's drainage company. The city was an important regional steamship port, owing that status to its location on Lake Tohopekaliga. Expanding the railroads into Central Florida eliminated the need for Kissimmee's steamship industry.

The Great Freeze of 1894-1895 ruined citrus crops, which had a detrimental ripple effect on the economy.

The hard-packed sand of Volusia County's beaches lent itself to auto races beginning in 1903 before paved roads were common, leading to the area's reputation for cars and racing. Ormond Beach was a popular spot for those who liked fast cars after the turn of the 20th century because the hard-packed beach was ideal for going fast. The same beach had led to the development of a tourist resort by Henry Flagler. It later attracted Flagler's former business partner John D. Rockefeller, who had a winter home in Ormond.

During and after World War II, the U.S. Army Air Forces (U.S. Air Force after 1947) and the U.S. Navy established several training facilities and operational bases in the region, mainly for aviation activities, followed by space exploration sites. In the late 1940s, the U.S. military established a missile testing facility on Merritt Island near Cape Canaveral. The land was largely undeveloped and the agreeable climate allowed for year-round operations. When NASA later searched for a long-term base in the 1960s to launch spacecraft, it chose the Merritt Island site next to Cape Canaveral for its access to the testing facility and nearby communities.

Deltona was developed in 1962 as a planned retirement community. It is now the largest city in Volusia County.

The construction of the Walt Disney World Resort was a transforming event for greater Orlando. Walt Disney wanted a location with abundant available land that was more accessible for the residents of the eastern United States to visit. Not only was there ample land in Central Florida, but it was inexpensive, and the inland location offered some protection from hurricanes. Plans were announced in 1965, and the theme park opened to the public in 1971.

Culture and attributes
Lamme and Oldakowski's survey identifies several demographic, political, and cultural elements that characterize Central Florida and distinguish it from other areas of the state. While people from all parts of the state associated their area as part of the South, people in the southern part of Central Florida did not typically identify their area as part of "Dixie", while people in northern Central Florida did. People from Central Florida usually did not consider their region part of the Bible Belt.

Politically, while North Florida overwhelmingly was considered conservative and South Florida was considered more liberal, the majority of Central Florida residents (52%) considered their area moderate; 41% considered it conservative, and 7% liberal. Lamme and Oldakowski's survey tracks with Barney Warf and Cynthia Waddell's studies of Florida's political geography during the 2000 Presidential election. Central Florida's economy is very similar to that in South Florida. Compared to the more diversified North Florida economy, tourism is by far the most significant industry in Central and South Florida, along with a much smaller but significant agricultural industry.

Lamme and Oldakowski's survey also found some cultural indicators that characterize Central Florida. In general, Central Florida was similar to North Florida and differed from South Florida in these measures. In Central and North Florida, American cuisine was the most popular food, in contrast to South Florida where ethnic foods were equally popular. Additionally, while there was little geographical variation for most styles of music, there was regional variation for both country and Latin music. Country was popular in Central and North Florida, and less so in South Florida, while Latin was less popular in Central and North Florida, and more so in South Florida.

Demographics
In 2009, the estimated total population of the Central Florida, including the populations of Orange, Seminole, Osceola, Brevard, Volusia, and Lake Counties region was 3.3 million people. If the populations of Polk and Sumter counties were included, the estimated population would be 3.969 million people. Explosive growth has fueled Central Florida for the past thirty years.

As of 2007 there were 70,000 Asians in Central Florida according to the U.S. Census. There were almost 1,900 Japanese persons, making up 3% of the Asians.

Cities
Selected cities in Central Florida arranged by population:

Economy
Agriculture has occupied a large portion of Central Florida's economy, with winter strawberries, citrus, timber, vegetables, and aquaculture all making major contributions.

Tourism is a large contributor to Central Florida's economy.

The area has economically diversified in the past decade. As a high-tech industrial hub, Metro Orlando has the seventh largest research park in the U.S., Central Florida Research Park, the engineering and business school of the University of Central Florida. It has defense companies such as Lockheed Martin and Siemens.

Medical research is prominent at Tampa's University of South Florida and Orlando's University of Central Florida, as well as the Sanford-Burnham Medical Research Institute biomedical research facility. USF in particular is a national leader in cancer and dementia research.

The Tampa Bay area has become a center of high-tech manufacturing and research, while both Orlando and the Tampa Bay area are centers for the financial industry, especially insurers and back-end operations for large banking companies. 

Active military installations in the region include Patrick Space Force Base and Cape Canaveral Space Force Station located on the Atlantic coast; MacDill Air Force Base, Coast Guard Air Station Clearwater and Coast Guard Sector St. Petersburg on the Gulf Coast; and Naval Support Activity Orlando, the Navy Pinecastle Impact (Bombing) Range, and the Avon Park Air Force Range located inland. These are augmented by major commands that are tenant activities at these installations, such as the headquarters for United States Central Command (USCENTCOM) and the headquarters for United States Special Operations Command (USSOCOM) at MacDill AFB, the Naval Ordnance Test Unit and Coast Guard Station Port Canaveral at Cape Canaveral SFS, and other Active, Reserve, Army National Guard, and Air National Guard activities that are located as either stand-alone facilities or as tenants on the active duty installations.

Additional former facilities that have since been closed and converted to civilian use include Hillsborough Army Air Field, a World War II training range which is now part of a neighborhood, Busch Gardens Tampa Bay, and the University of South Florida; Naval Air Station Sanford, which closed in 1968 and is the present day Orlando-Sanford International Airport; McCoy Air Force Base, which closed in 1975 and is the present day Orlando International Airport; and Orlando Air Force Base, which was transferred to the Navy in 1968 and renamed Naval Training Center Orlando until its BRAC-directed closure in 1999 and conversion to the present day Baldwin Park neighborhood.

The other major U.S. Government installations in Central Florida is the Kennedy Space Center, a NASA facility located adjacent to Cape Canaveral SFS, and the Department of Veterans Affairs (VA) Outpatient Clinic at Baldwin Park (former Orlando AFB Hospital / former Naval Hospital Orlando) and the VA Hospital at Lake Nona.

Attractions

Theme parks 
 Walt Disney World Resort, which includes Magic Kingdom, Epcot, Disney's Hollywood Studios, Disney's Animal Kingdom, Disney's Typhoon Lagoon and Disney's Blizzard Beach
 SeaWorld Orlando
 Universal Orlando Resort, which includes Universal Studios Florida, Universal's Islands of Adventure and Universal's Volcano Bay
 Busch Gardens Tampa and Adventure Island
 Legoland Florida
 Kennedy Space Center
 Gatorland
 Fun Spot America Theme Parks

Zoos 
Central Florida has four major zoos, the Central Florida Zoo and Botanical Gardens in Sanford, the Brevard Zoo in Melbourne, the Busch Gardens Tampa Bay animal park, and Lowry Park Zoo in Tampa. There are also two theme parks in Orlando featuring animals, albeit to a much lesser extent: Disney's Animal Kingdom and SeaWorld Orlando.

Natural areas 
Central Florida also has a wide variety of natural attractions including the Bok Tower Gardens, Wekiwa Springs State Park, Blue Spring State Park, Rock Springs Run State Reserve, Canaveral National Seashore, and Merritt Island National Wildlife Refuge. The region also boasts an extensive network of recreational trails (jogging, biking, equestrian, etc.). While many connections are already in place, construction continues and will link all of the trails and greenways. Major trails include the Cady Way, Cross Seminole and West Orange Trails. Many of the top ranked beaches in the United States are located in Central Florida.

Transportation

Airports
Major international airports include:

Seaports

Port Canaveral, located in Cape Canaveral 45 minutes east of Orlando, is a cruise, cargo, and naval port. It is one of the busiest ports in Florida and is economically tied to Orlando. Locally perceived to be Orlando's seaport, Port Canaveral is the closest port for tourists and Orlando residents alike to cruise on Disney Cruise Lines and Carnival Cruises. Future plans for the port include a rail and natural gas line running directly to Orlando International Airport.

Another major seaport of the region is Port Tampa Bay, which is one of the busiest in the state and is on the verge of a huge expansion which will allow it to compete on an international level.

Freeways and highways

Limited Access Freeways and Expressways:

Major Surface Arterials:

Public transportation

A regional commuter rail network is being developed in Central Florida. The first of these initiatives, SunRail, is a commuter rail line that will run from DeLand south to Kissimmee. The first phase should be complete by 2013 with the full system in place by 2015. Amtrak also serves Central Florida running on CSX Transportation's A line and stops at the Orlando Amtrak station. The Auto Train stops in Sanford, Florida, north of downtown Orlando.

As of 2022, a high speed rail between Orlando and Miami is currently being developed by Brightline, who plans to extend the rail to Tampa after completion.

Education

Florida's public primary and secondary schools are administered by the Florida Department of Education.

Notes

References

 

 A History of Central Florida Collection on the RICHES Mosaic Interface Map

External links

A History of Central Florida Podcast

 
Regions of Florida
Orange County, Florida
Osceola County, Florida
Seminole County, Florida
Lake County, Florida
Brevard County, Florida
Volusia County, Florida
Hillsborough County, Florida
Pinellas County, Florida
Polk County, Florida
Sumter County, Florida